Hubert Rigney (born 30 July 1971 in Banagher, County Offaly) is an Irish former sportsperson.  He played hurling with his local club St Rynagh's and with the Offaly senior inter-county team from 1990 until 2002.

Playing career

Club

Rigney played his club hurling with the St Rynagh's club in Banagher.  He started playing hurling at the age of 11 and won his first medal at the age of 13 when his side defeated Portumna in Galway.  As a member of the senior team Rigney captured three county titles in 1990, 1992 and 1993.  This final win was later converted into a Leinster club title.

Inter-county

Rigney first came to prominence on the inter-county scene as a member of the Offaly minor hurling team in the late 1980s.  He won a Leinster title in this grade in 1989 before later capturing an All-Ireland title following a victory over Clare.  Rigney later joined the Offaly under-21 team where he captured a Leinster title in 1991.  He added a second Leinster under-21 medal to his collection in 1993, however, he never collected an All-Ireland medal in this grade.

Rigney became a member of the Offaly senior panel in 1990.  In the spring of 1991 he captured a National Hurling League title, Offaly's first, and the future was looking brighter for the midlands team.  Three years later in 1994 Rigney was a key member of the Offaly team as he first Leinster title. Offaly later progressed to the All-Ireland final where they played Limerick. With four minutes to go Offaly were trailing by five points, however, a scoring spree in the remaining time resulted in the side winning the game by 6 points. Offaly manager Éamonn Cregan had orchestrated a great win over has native county and Rigney collected his first All-Ireland medal, while also picking up an All Star Award.

In 1995 Rigney captured a second Leinster medal. The game itself against Kilkenny was regarded as the best game of the year and is regarded as one of the greatest games of all-time by some for the sheer level of skill displayed by both teams. Rigney's side later went on to lose the All-Ireland final to Clare, who won their first All-Ireland title since 1914.

1998 proved to be a controversial year for Offaly. Rigney's side reached the Leinster final but lost to Kilkenny. This defeat prompted their manager, Babs Keating, to describe the Offaly hurlers as "sheep in a heap", and he promptly resigned. It looked as if Offaly's championship hopes were in disarray, however, they overcame Antrim in the All-Ireland quarter-final and qualified to meet Clare in the semi-final, with Galway's Michael Bond now in charge. The first game ended in a draw and had to be replayed; however, the replay was ended minutes early because of a timekeeping error by the referee. Following a protest on the pitch of Croke Park by the Offaly supporters it was decided that Clare and Offaly would meet for a third time. Rigney's side won the third game and qualified to play Kilkenny in the final. Offaly reversed the Leinster final defeat by winning the All-Ireland final by 6 points in a game which saw Brian Whelahan play at full-forward. Rigney won his second All-Ireland medal and lifted the cup.

In 1999 Offaly once again reached the latter stages of the All-Ireland championship, however, they were beaten by Cork in the All-Ireland semi-final.  2000 proved to be another controversial year.  Team manager Pat Fleury surprisingly omitted Rigney from the squad that was due to play Kilkenny in the All-Ireland final.  Offaly lost that game and Rigney later declared that he no longer wanted to play for his club St. Rynagh's or for Offaly.  It was a withdrawal from hurling in protest.  He was later coaxed back to the county team in 2001 and continued to play until his retirement in 2002.

Personal life

Hubert is chairman of the Offaly branch of the 'Collins 22 Society', which pays tribute to Irish revolutionary leader Michael Collins.

References

1971 births
Living people
St Rynagh's hurlers
Offaly inter-county hurlers
All-Ireland Senior Hurling Championship winners